Gloria Radulescu (born 25 September 1991) is an Italian actress.

Early life and career 

Born premature, in Rome to a Romanian father and an Italian mother, Gloria spent her youth in the town of Corato due to a respiratory crisis at the age of two and a half, caused by smog-induced asthma. She attends the liceo artistico Federico II where she obtains a qualification as a goldsmith's art teacher. 

In 2012 she participated in the 73rd edition of Miss Italia (one of the eight Apulian finalists) with the band n.36 “Miss Eleganza Silvian Heach Puglia”, ranking among the top ten.

In 2013 she graduated from the acting and diction center Teatrificio 22, while the following year she enrolled at the Rome Centro Sperimentale di Cinematografia, graduating in 2016.

In 2018, after some appearances in TV series (including the regular presence in the first season of Non dirlo al mio capo and in the fourth one of Le tre rose di Eva), she gets the role of Marta Guarnieri, a young heiress of the 60s in the soap opera Il paradiso delle signore.

Filmography

Film
Beware the Gorilla, directed by Luca Miniero (2019)
L'ultimo giorno del toro, directed by Alessandro Zizzo (2020)

Television
Provaci ancora prof!, TV series, episode 6x06 (2015)
Un passo dal cielo, TV series, episode 3x15 (2015)
Il candidato - Zucca presidente, TV series, episode 2x02 (2015)
Il sistema, TV series, episode 6 (2016)
Non dirlo al mio capo, TV series, first season (2016)
Le tre rose di Eva, TV series, fourth season (2018)
Don Matteo, TV series, episode 11x06 (2018)
Il paradiso delle signore, soap opera (2018-)

References

External links

1991 births
Living people
Italian film actresses
Actresses from Rome
Italian stage actresses
Italian television actresses
Italian people of Romanian descent
Mass media people from Rome
21st-century Italian actresses